Nikolas Konrad Veratschnig (born 24 January 2003) is an Austrian professional footballer who plays as a midfielder for Wolfsberger AC.

Career
Veratschnig is a youth product of Feldkirchen, and moved to Wolfsberger AC's academy in 2017. He started training with Wolsfberger's reserves in 2020. On 2 December 2021, he signed his first professional contract with the club until June 2024. He made his professional debut with them in a 1–0 Austrian Football Bundesliga loss to Austria Wien on 22 February 2022.

International career
Veratschnig is a youth international for Austria, having represented the Austria U18s and U19s.

References

External links
 
 OEFB Profile

2003 births
Living people
Sportspeople from Villach
Footballers from Carinthia (state)
Austrian footballers
Austria youth international footballers
Wolfsberger AC players
Austrian Football Bundesliga players
Austrian Regionalliga players
Association football midfielders